Red Lobster Hospitality LLC is an American casual dining restaurant chain headquartered in Orlando, Florida. The company has operations across most of the United States (including Puerto Rico, Guam) and Canada, as well as in China, Ecuador, Hong Kong, Japan, Malaysia, Mexico, Philippines, Turkey and the United Arab Emirates; as of June 23, 2020, the company had 719 locations worldwide. Golden Gate Capital became Red Lobster's parent company when it was acquired from Darden Restaurants on July 28, 2014. Seafood supplier Thai Union acquired a 25 percent stake in the company in 2016 for a reported $575 million, and in 2020 purchased the remaining portion from GGC.

On August 6, 2014, Red Lobster announced its new headquarters location in CNL Center City Commons in Orlando. On March 6, 2015, Red Lobster officially opened the Restaurant Support Center.

History

Formation and growth
The first Red Lobster restaurant was opened on January 18, 1968, in Lakeland, Florida, by entrepreneurs Bill Darden and Charley Woodsby.  The oft-quoted date of March 1968 is based on the March 27, 1968 incorporation of Red Lobster Inns of America, Inc. (now GMRI, Inc.) in the Florida Secretary of State's Office.

Originally billed as a "Harbor for Seafood Lovers", the first restaurant was followed by four others throughout the American South. In 1970, General Mills acquired Red Lobster as a five-unit company. With new backing, the chain expanded rapidly in the 1980s.

Red Lobster entered Canada in the 1980s, in many cases by buying Ponderosa restaurant locations. Currently, Red Lobster generally maintains between 25 and 30 locations in Canada, the bulk in larger urban centres in Ontario (across southern Ontario plus one in Sudbury, in northern Ontario) with a smaller number in larger urban centres in all three Prairie provinces.  It exited the Quebec market in September 1997, due to financial losses, and never attempted to enter British Columbia

In 1992, Red Lobster introduced its now famous Cheddar Bay Biscuits, developed by culinary leader Kurt Hankins.

On March 29, 1994, Bill Darden died, after an extended illness, at the age of 75.

In 1995, Red Lobster (along with Olive Garden and other sister chains), became part of Darden Restaurants, Inc.  During that time, General Mills decided to release Darden into an independent, publicly traded corporation.

2009 prototype and sale

In 2009, Red Lobster debuted its new Bar Harbor restaurant prototype modeled after coastal New England architecture. The new exterior features include shingle and stone towers, signal flags, and Adirondack-style benches. The interior updates include dark wood paneling, warm-toned fabrics, soft lighting, and nautical decor and artwork.

On December 19, 2013, Darden Restaurants announced plans to sell or spin off the Red Lobster brand, citing pressure from stock investors. This was in direct response to Darden's going over budget on a new digital platform.

On May 12, 2014, Darden announced that as part of its spinoff of Red Lobster, it was converting the co-located Red Lobster and Olive Garden locations into standalone Olive Garden locations. On May 16, 2014, Darden announced it would be selling the Red Lobster seafood restaurant chain to Golden Gate Capital for US$2.1 billion. Darden announced the completion of the sale of Red Lobster on July 28, 2014.

On August 6, 2014, Red Lobster announced their new headquarters location in CNL Center City Commons in Orlando. On March 6, 2015, Red Lobster officially opened the Restaurant Support Center. Seafood supplier Thai Union acquired a 25 percent stake in the company in 2016 for a reported $575 million, and in 2020 purchased the remaining portion from GGC.

Promotions

Red Lobster has offered an endless snow crab leg promotion twice in its history (as of September 2003). However, in 2003, the promotion resulted in its parent company, Darden Restaurants', taking a $3 million charge to third-quarter earnings, resulting in president Edna Morris' departure from the company.

The ill-timed promotion was launched amid high wholesale crab leg prices. The chain also underestimated how many times a customer would order more. Further complicating matters at the restaurant level was the amount of time customers spent table-side in the restaurant cracking crab legs. This resulted in increased wait times in the lobby and overall diminished customer capacity per hour.

In February 2016, American singer Beyoncé referenced Red Lobster in her single "Formation". After unexpectedly releasing the single and performing it during the Super Bowl 50 halftime show, Red Lobster reported a 33% sales increase due to the reference.

Red Lobster introduced a new Daily Deals menu in 2020, featuring Endless Shrimp Mondays and more deals.

Menu
The brand specializes in seafood, including crab, fish, lobster, mollusks, and shrimp. It also serves chicken, desserts, pasta, and steak.

Lobster bisque controversy 
In February 2016, Inside Edition reported that Red Lobster used a mix of less expensive langostino along with Maine lobster in their lobster bisque recipe.

Locations
As of June 23, 2020, the company had 719 locations worldwide. These locations span 44 US states (including Puerto Rico, Guam), China, Canada, Ecuador, Hong Kong, Japan, Malaysia, Mexico, the Philippines, Qatar, and the United Arab Emirates.

See also
 
 List of casual dining restaurant chains
 List of seafood restaurants
 Last Night at the Lobster, a 2007 novel based around a Red Lobster restaurant

References

External links
 

Companies based in Orlando, Florida
Restaurants established in 1968
Restaurant chains in the United States
Seafood restaurants in the United States
American companies established in 1968
1968 establishments in Florida
2014 mergers and acquisitions
Private equity portfolio companies
Seafood restaurants